Huide Tower is a skyscraper in Longhua District, Shenzhen. It is 258 meters tall and has 58 above-ground floors and 3 underground floors. It has a floor area of 173,500 m2. It functions as an office building and a hotel. Construction started in 2015 and ended in 2019. Huide Tower is the 31st tallest building in Shenzhen and 429th tallest in the world. Huide Tower was designed by HPP Architects.

The tower was developed by China Railway Construction Engineering Group and Shenzhen Metro. It was built as part of transit oriented development in the area, as it is located near to the adjacent Shenzhen North train station.

See also
 List of tallest buildings in Shenzhen

References

Skyscrapers in Shenzhen
Office buildings in Shenzhen
Hotels in Shenzhen